George William Gekas (April 14, 1930 – December 16, 2021) was an American politician from Pennsylvania who served as a Republican member of the U.S. House of Representatives for Pennsylvania's 17th congressional district from 1983 to 2003.

Early life and education
George Gekas was born in Harrisburg, Pennsylvania, the son of Mary (Touloumes) and William Gekas. He graduated from William Penn High School in 1948. He received a B.A. degree from Dickinson College in 1952 and a J.D. degree from Dickinson School of Law in 1958. He was a member of the fraternity Sigma Alpha Epsilon. He served in the United States Army from 1953 to 1955.

Career 
He worked in a private law practice for two years and then served as assistant district attorney for Dauphin County from 1960 to 1966.

Pennsylvania Legislature
In 1966, Gekas was elected to the Pennsylvania House of Representatives for the 103rd district. He served there until 1974, when he was upset by future Harrisburg mayor Steven Reed in the anti-Watergate Democratic landslide. Gekas served as a member of the Pennsylvania State Senate for the 15th district from 1977 to 1982.

United States House of Representatives
After the 1980 census, Pennsylvania lost two congressional districts. The Republican-controlled legislature drew a new Harrisburg-based district that Gekas won in 1982, becoming the first Greek-American elected to Congress from Pennsylvania. Gekas was reelected nine more times.

Gekas was one of the House managers in the impeachment trials of Alcee Hastings and President Bill Clinton.

2002 House Campaign
In a 2002 PoliticsPA feature story designating politicians with yearbook superlatives, he was named "Missing in Action." Pennsylvania lost two districts after the 2000 census and resulting redistricting. One of the districts that was eliminated was the Reading-based 6th District, represented by five-term moderate-to-conservative Democrat Tim Holden. The legislature split the 6th among three other districts, with the largest slice, including Holden's home in St. Clair, going to Gekas' 17th District.

Holden ran in the 17th, even though it was 65% new to him (a small portion of the even more Republican 9th District had been shifted to the 17th). On election night, Holden defeated Gekas by almost 6,000 votes. Gekas was the only Republican incumbent placed in a district with a Democratic incumbent to be defeated for re-election in 2002.

Later life and death
After his electoral defeat in 2002, Gekas returned to Harrisburg, where he established a law practice. He continued to reside in Harrisburg until his death on December 16, 2021, at the age of 91.

References

External links

 
George Gekas on the issues
The Political Graveyard

|-

|-

|-

1930 births
2021 deaths
20th-century American lawyers
20th-century American politicians
21st-century American politicians
American people of Greek descent
County district attorneys in Pennsylvania
Dickinson College alumni
Republican Party members of the Pennsylvania House of Representatives
Military personnel from Pennsylvania
Pennsylvania lawyers
Republican Party Pennsylvania state senators
Politicians from Harrisburg, Pennsylvania
Republican Party members of the United States House of Representatives from Pennsylvania
United States Army soldiers